Events from the year 1881 in Russia.

Incumbents
 Monarch – Alexander II (until March 13), Alexander III (after March 13)

Events
 January 1–January 24 – Siege of Geok Tepe: the Turkomans is defeated by Russian troops under General Mikhail Skobelev.
 March 13 – Alexander II of Russia is killed by a bomb near his palace, an act falsely blamed upon Russian Jews. He is succeeded by his son, Alexander III.
 April 15 – Anti-Semitic pogroms in Southern Russia.
 December 25-December 27 – Warsaw pogrom, Vistula Land, Russian Empire

Undated
Polish–Lithuanian Social Revolutionary Party is founded.

Births
4 February - Kliment Voroshilov, Russian military officer, politician (d. 1969)
12 February - Anna Pavlova, Russian prima ballerina. (d. 1931)
25 February - Alexei Rykov, Premier of Russia and  Premier of the Soviet Union (d. 1938)
4 May - Alexander Kerensky, Russian politician (d.  1970)
16 October - Alexey Schastny, Russian naval officer (d. 1918)
14 November - Nicholas Schenck, Russian-born American film studio executive (d. 1969)

Deaths

 - Fyodor Dostoyevsky, Russian novelist, short story writer, essayist, journalist and philosopher. (b. 1821)
 - Alexander II of Russia, Emperor of Russia. (b. 1818)
 - Modest Mussorgsky, composer (b. 1839)
 - Nikolay Pirogov, scientist and doctor (b. 1810

References

Years of the 19th century in the Russian Empire